Alcanivorax gelatiniphagus  is a Gram-negative and rod-shaped bacterium from the genus of Alcanivorax which has been isolated from tidal flat sediments from Taean County in Korea.

References

 

Oceanospirillales
Bacteria described in 2015